Abdul Karim Soomro is a Pakistani politician who had been a Member of the Provincial Assembly of Sindh, from 2008 to May 2018. He was re-elected in 2018 general election.

Early life and education
He was born on 3 November 1962.

He is a graduate.

Political career

He was elected to the Provincial Assembly of Sindh as a candidate of Pakistan Peoples Party (PPP) from Constituency PS-54 (Tando Muhammad Khan-Cum-Badin) in 2008 Pakistani general election. He received 26,082 votes and defeated Sayed Muhammad Kamil Shah, a candidate of Pakistan Muslim League (Q) (PML-Q).

He was re-elected to the Provincial Assembly of Sindh as a candidate of PPP from Constituency PS-54 (Tando Muhammad Khan-cum-Badin) in 2013 Pakistani general election. He received 35,444 votes and defeated an independent candidate, Syed Shabbir Hyder Shah.

He was re-elected to Provincial Assembly of Sindh as a candidate of PPP from Constituency PS-69 (Tando Muhammad Khan-II) in 2018 Pakistani general election.

References

Living people
Sindh MPAs 2013–2018
1962 births
Pakistan People's Party MPAs (Sindh)
Sindh MPAs 2008–2013
Sindh MPAs 2018–2023